Vilde Lockert (born April 28, 1970), is a musician and currently vocalist and lyrics-writer for Magenta. She has done guest vocals for Apoptygma Berzerk, Arcturus, Fleurety as well as being vocalist in Vandalist Virgin and Femme Brutale.

Personal life
Vilde Lockert was born in Tromsø, but moved all over Norway due to her father's military career. She had a modeling career in the UK and Spain in the early 90s until she moved to Oslo in 1995 and joined Magenta.

Discography
MAGENTA
Magenta EP 1997 AT&MT
One MInd SGL 1998 Tatra
Periode 1998 Tatra
All Over SGL 2002 Re:pop
Little Girl Lost 2002 Re:pop
Art and Accidents 2009 AT&MT

APOPTYGMA BERZERK
Shine on EP 2006 GUN/SonyBMG
Black EP 2006 Metropolis

Bandography
Varig Visjon - 1989 - 1990 - Vocals
Magenta - 1995–Present/Vocals
Vandalist Virgin - 2003 - 2005
Femme Brutale - 2005 - 2006
Apoptygma Berzerk - 2006/vocals

References

1970 births
Living people
Norwegian singer-songwriters
21st-century Norwegian singers
21st-century Norwegian women singers
Musicians from Tromsø